Ali Kahrizi (also Romanized as ‘Ālī Kahrīzī; also known as ‘Alī Kahrīz) is a village in Arshaq-e Gharbi Rural District, Moradlu District, Meshgin Shahr County, Ardabil Province, Iran. At the 2006 census, its population was 121, in 35 families.

References 

Towns and villages in Meshgin Shahr County